Radio Nasha (Hindi: रेडियो नशा) is an Indian radio channel that focuses on broadcasting retro Bollywood songs from the 1970s to the 1990s and creating a social radio community based on that genre. Its broadcast frequency is 91.9 MHz in Mumbai and 107.2 MHz in Delhi. It was launched in March 2016.

Nasha is a Hindi word signifying the inebriated state of one after their consumption of alcoholic substances. The station claims to have gained over 9.1 million listeners in its first year. The CEO of Radio Nasha is Harshad Jain.

Content 

 "Jhakaas Morning" with RJ Rohini at 7am (Mon-Fri).
 "Crazy for Kishore" with RJ Sudhesh Bhosle at 11am (Mon-Fri).
 "The Picture Pandey" with RJ Anurag Pandey at 12pm (Mon-Fri).
 "The G9 Show" with RJ Divyasolgama at 2pm (Mon-Fri).
 "Dhak Dhak Evening" with RJ Akriti at 4pm (Mon-Fri).
 "The Filmy Calendar Show" with RJ Satish Kaushik at 7pm (Mon-Fri).

References

Radio stations in India